The Battle of Lalsot was fought between the Rajputs of Jaipur and Jodhpur against Marathas under Mahadji Scindia to collect taxes from the Rajput States. Mahadji as the Naib Vakil-i-Mutlaq of the Mughal Emperor, demanded Rs.63,00,000 from the Jaipur court, however these demands were refused, upon which Mahadji marched against Jaipur with his army. A part of the Mughal army under Hamdani deserted and defected to the Rajput army before the battle.

Battle
The battle started with cannonade on both sides. The Jaipur army stayed back in a defensive position as they had long range artillery, the cannonade continued till 11 O'Clock,  the Maratha army faced some casualties as they had light artillery and could not counterattack effectively. The Rathor horsemen of Jodhpur however grew impatient and around 4000 of them with their chieftains and family heads charged the Maratha army leaving their general Bhim Singh behind. Benoît de Boigne's Campoos infantry shot the Rathors with artillery and musket fire killing many, however the Rathors undaunted by the casualties charged the Marathas and broke into their left wing, many from the Maratha side were killed, the Rathors pushed deep into Maratha lines and attacked De Boigne, forcing him to retreat after a short fight.  

Rana Khan upon seeing his left wing crumble, sent reinforcements under Shivaji Vithal, Rayaji Patil and Khande Hari, they slowly rallied the fleeing soldiers and fought "the bloodiest and most obstinate struggle of the day". The Jaipur army however did not take advantage of this opening created by the reckless charge and held their positions. The Rathors upon seeing no reinforcements, started losing morale as the Maratha reserves were now approaching them, they were finally pushed back.  

The right wing of the Maratha army fared better as they unknowingly killed Muhammad Beg Hamdani, by a stray shot from a cannon. Hamdani's soldiers made a charge at the Maratha right wing, but were pushed back. Upon knowing that their general was dead, the Mughals did not make another attempt to attack the Maratha army. 

The Rathors did make attempts to capture the Maratha artillery, they charged the Maratha army four times but were repelled in all their attempts. The two armies held their positions till midnight and then returned to their camps. Mahadji did not make any advances as he did not know about Muhammad Beg's death. Mahadji also feared that the Rajput and Mughal soldiers in his own army may change sides. There was some cannonade but both sides remained in their camps for the rest of the war.

Aftermath
Mahadji was forced to retreat on 1 August 1787. Rajput claimed victory in this battle. However all successive charges by the Rathore cavalry were repulsed and no gunnery of the Marathas could be captured. The Rajputs also had higher casualties, mostly suffered by the Jodhpur army as they lost more than a thousand Rathor horsemen. On the other hand, the Marathas did not manage to rout the enemy out of their camps because they were unaware of Hamadani's death until the night, and partly because it began to rain in the after noon, making that sandy plain difficult for artillery movement, and the Marathas were afraid of the ravines in front, the on-coming dark ness and the lack of wells in that tract. So each side fell back to its camp and resorted to random firing till an hour after sunset in order to guard against a surprise attack in the darkness. Thus the battle of Tunga miscalled as that of Lalsot-"though sanguinary, had no decisive result". 

Ultimately Mahadaji Shinde's forces had to retreat owing to treachery and dissensions in his own ranks and the utter failure of provisions. Knowing the situation in Rajputana and Maratha failure in Lalsot, Nana Fadnavis, the senior Minister of the Peshwa, send additional troops of 10,000 soldiers to help of Mahadji Shinde.

Second Panipat
Scindia saved his army by a masterly retreat but the terror experienced by his captains who called it a second Panipat, proves the defeat of his strategy.

References

Lalsot
Lalsot
1787 in India
Lalsot